Aurantivirga is a Gram-negative, aerobic, proteorhodopsin-containing and rod-shaped genus of bacteria from the family of Flavobacteriaceae with one known species (Aurantivirga profunda). Aurantivirga profunda has been isolated from deep seawater from the Pacific Ocean.

References

Flavobacteria
Bacteria genera
Monotypic bacteria genera
Taxa described in 2015